Alan Friedman (born 1956) is an American journalist, author and former media and public relations executive.

Alan Friedman may also refer to:
 Alan Warren Friedman, professor of English and comparative literature
 Alan H. Friedman (1928–2019), novelist, short story writer, and literary critic
 Alan J. Friedman (1943–2014), physicist

See also
 Alan E. Freedman (1889–1980), pioneer and executive in the motion picture film processing industry
 Allan Friedman (born 1949), professor of neurosurgery